Jutty Ranx is an American electronic dance music band, consisting of vocalist Justin Taylor, Jaakko Manninen, a DJ associated with the Finnish act Beats and Styles and Ryan Malina.  Their debut single "I See You" has been listed in the official Italian digital downloads chart, certified by FIMI, for 13 weeks; it peaked at number 3 in March 2013. It was also certified 2xplatinum for selling more than 60,000 copies.

They released their self-titled debut album on May 21, 2013, in Italy, with summer release globally. Jutty Ranx's second album, Discordia, is released on June 23, 2015.

Discography

Studio albums
Jutty Ranx (2013)
Discordia (2015)

Singles

References

External links
 Official website
 Facebook page
 I see you on YouTube

American dance music groups
American electronic music groups